Sindu Sudjojono (1913-1986) was an Indonesian painter as well as the co-founder of PERSAGI, an organization of Indonesian artists. He primarily painted portraits.  His paintings have been on exhibit and have sold for more than 1 million dollars.

References 

1913 births
1986 deaths
20th-century Indonesian painters